Cheaper by the Dozen is a 1950 American comedy film based upon the autobiographical book Cheaper by the Dozen (1948) by Frank Bunker Gilbreth Jr. and Ernestine Gilbreth Carey. The film and book describe growing up in a family with twelve children, in Montclair, New Jersey. The title comes from one of Gilbreth's favorite jokes, which played out in the film, that when he and his family were out driving and stopped at a red light, a pedestrian would ask: "Hey, mister! How come you got so many kids?" Gilbreth would pretend to ponder the question carefully, and then, just as the light turned green, would say: "Well, they come cheaper by the dozen, you know", and drive off.

The story of the Gilbreth family is continued in the book Belles on Their Toes, which was adapted as a film in 1952, with some of the original cast.

Plot
The parents are the time and motion study and efficiency expert Frank Bunker Gilbreth Sr. and psychologist Lillian Moller Gilbreth. The film shows typical days in the lives of a family in the 1920s, but here with 12 children and an efficiency engineer as the parent. Frank employs his unorthodox teaching methods on his children, and there are clashes between parents and children.

Frank takes every opportunity to study motion and increase efficiency, including filming his children's tonsillectomies to see if there are ways to streamline the operation.
He escorts his daughter to her prom as a chaperone but ends up chatting and dancing with her female friends.

At the end, Frank is sent on a lecture tour to Europe, expecting to visit Prague and London. He phones Lillian from the station but the line goes dead as he has had a heart attack. After Frank's sudden death, the family agree that Lillian will continue with her husband's work, beginning with giving his lectures in Europe; this enables the family to remain in their house, rather than move to their grandmother's in California, although, with a widowed working mother and one income, the children will have to assume much greater responsibilities.

Cast

Comparison to real life
The birth order in which Cheaper by the Dozen portrays some of the children is not the same order in which the real Gilbreth children were born. For example, Robert (who was born in 1920) is shown as being born in 1922, as the last child after Jane (who was born in 1922). This is reversed in the movie's sequel.

In real life, Mary, who was the second child, died in 1912, aged 5. However, in the film Cheaper by the Dozen, Mary is placed as the third child after Ernestine, and has few or no lines.

Both Frank and Lillian Gilbreth were important figures in real life. The voice-over at the end of the film informs the audience that Lillian went on to become the world's leading efficiency expert and Woman of the Year in 1948, a title bestowed by the Twentieth Century Club of Buffalo.

Reception
Reviews from critics were mostly positive. Bosley Crowther of The New York Times wrote that "it all adds up to entertainment of a broad, brash and innocent sort." Variety called it "a lot of fun" with "a lot of humor, and just enough clutching at the heart to please any audience." Harrison's Reports called it "delightfully amusing" with comedy "that keeps one chuckling throughout and at times reaches hilarious proportions." "Pleasant light entertainment", reported The Monthly Film Bulletin. John McCarten of The New Yorker was less enthused, writing that "since nothing much happens in the way of conflict, there just isn't any drama, and the piece boils down to one of those typical fluffy comedies about home life in America."

References

External links

 
 
 
 
 

1950 films
1950 comedy-drama films
20th Century Fox films
American comedy-drama films
1950s English-language films
Films about families
Films based on biographies
Films directed by Walter Lang
Films scored by Cyril J. Mockridge
Films set in the 1920s
Films set in Rhode Island
Films set in New Jersey
Films shot in New Jersey
Films with screenplays by Lamar Trotti
American children's comedy films
Films about parenting
1950s American films